The Tommy Tour was a concert tour by the English rock band the Who. It was in support of their fourth album, the rock opera Tommy (1969), and consisted of concerts split between North America and Europe. Following a press reception gig, the tour officially began on 9 May 1969 and ended on 20 December 1970. The set list featured the majority of the songs from Tommy, as well as originals and covers.

After multiple rehearsals and warm-up gigs, the band did a private show at Ronnie Scott's Jazz Club, London in early May 1969 intended to preview Tommy to the press. Subsequently, the band did a North American tour playing the new album, which was well received by audiences. Following a UK tour, the band played the Tanglewood Music Shed and the Woodstock festival. After Woodstock, the band headlined the second Isle of Wight festival and played Tommy at the Concertgebouw in Amsterdam, one of the world's forefront opera houses. The band continued to tour North America, emphasized by eight shows done over the course of six days at the Fillmore East in New York City. The Who ended 1969 with tour of Europe that continued into 1970, including a show at the London Coliseum on 14 December, which was filmed for a possible future Tommy film.

The group began 1970 by bringing Tommy to various European opera houses. During their tour, the critically acclaimed live album Live at Leeds was recorded during a show at the University of Leeds Refectory, Leeds. After the European tour wrapped up, the band returned to the United States for a tour, starting with two shows at the Metropolitan Opera House, New York City in June. Following the tour, the band played several concerts in Europe, including a headlining appearance at the third Isle of Wight festival in August. The band ended the Tommy Tour with a benefit concert at the Roundhouse in London.

History 
1969 was a transitional year for the band, due almost entirely to Pete Townshend's rock opera Tommy, which they had begun recording the previous autumn. After a series of rehearsals and warm-up gigs, the band gave a preview concert to the press at London's Ronnie Scott's Jazz Club on 1 May. Realising the opera's narrative was too difficult to comprehend, Townshend explained a synopsis of the story, before the Who played Tommy at roaring volume. The next day, the band flew to New York to start the North American tour, commencing on 9 May at the Grande Ballroom in Detroit. On 29 May, the band began a three-night residency at Chicago's Kinetic Playground. They noticed the audience would all stand up at the same time, and stay standing, indicating that live performances of Tommy had a positive reaction from audiences. After finishing a series of tour dates in San Francisco during June, the Who flew to London to do two shows for the Royal Albert Hall's Pop Proms concert series. The first show resulted into a fracas involving Teddy Boys who attempted to prevent the band from coming on stage, but the second show went smoothly as the Teds were satisfied with renditions of "Summertime Blues" and "Shakin' All Over". On 10 August, the band suspended their UK tour to do two contracted appearances at the Tanglewood Music Shed and the Woodstock festival.

After playing a show at Tanglewood on 12 August, the band flew to New York to play a set at Woodstock. Due to a fourteen-hour delay, the band became reluctant to play and demanded their $12,500 fee. The Who were scheduled to perform the previous day, 16 August, but the festival ran late and they did not take to the stage until the early hours of the 17th. After playing "Pinball Wizard", Yippie founder Abbie Hoffman interrupted the show to protest the arrest of John Sinclair before getting kicked offstage by Townshend, and the sun rose almost as if on cue during "See Me, Feel Me". After returning to England, the band headlined the second Isle of Wight festival on 30 August. Though most media attention focused on Bob Dylan making his first British appearance in three years, the Who stole the show. Townshend later said, "We know that the stage act we had, with Tommy in it, would work under any circumstances, because it had worked many times on tour."

The "world premiere" of Tommy took place on 29 September at the Concertgebouw in Amsterdam, one of the most prestigious opera houses in the world. During the band's entrance, drummer Keith Moon suffered an injury after knocking down two speaker cabinets. The show later became a bootleg recording. The band started another North American tour on 10 October at the Commonwealth Armory in Boston, emphasized by a six-night stand at the Fillmore East in New York City. One show at the Fillmore was attended by Leonard Bernstein, who praised the band for their new music. The Who ended 1969 with a tour of Europe that continued into 1970, including a show at the London Coliseum on 14 December, which was filmed for a possible future Tommy feature.

1970 began with the group bringing Tommy to various European opera houses, a trend they had begun in December 1969 when they performed at the London Coliseum. Included were January stops at the Théâtre des Champs-Élysées in Paris, the Royal Danish Theatre in Copenhagen, and three opera houses in West Germany. The band then focused again on recording a live album. While performances on 14 February at the University of Leeds Refectory and 15 February at Hull City Hall were both recorded, only the Leeds recording was deemed suitable for release, as the bass track was inadvertently not captured during the first few songs at the Hull show. The result was the legendary Live at Leeds, which became a hallmark live rock album.

After beginning recording sessions for a planned new album, the group returned to the United States for a 30-day tour in June and July to support Tommy. In the year since the release of Tommy, the group had become rock superstars and now commanded considerably larger venues than on previous stints in the country, when they played mostly in theatres and colleges. The tour began with the band's final opera house date, as they performed two shows at New York City's Metropolitan Opera House. Following the American tour, the band was one of the headlining acts at the third Isle of Wight festival and embarked on a short European tour shortly afterward. A series of concerts in the United Kingdom followed, the last being a Christmas benefit concert at the Roundhouse in London where they included what was intended to be the last complete performance of Tommy, although it would be played again a few times in 1989. Townshend would lead the group into his Lifehouse vision when they began performing in 1971.

Personnel 
 Roger Daltrey – lead vocals, harmonica, tambourine
 Pete Townshend – guitar, vocals
 John Entwistle – bass guitar, vocals
 Keith Moon – drums

Repertoire 
The band performed the entirety of Tommy, with the exception of "Cousin Kevin", "Underture", "Sensation" and "Welcome" because they weren't considered suitable for live performance. Aside from the new material, songs such as "Happy Jack", "A Quick One, While He's Away", "Young Man Blues", "Summertime Blues", "My Generation", and "Magic Bus" were featured heavily in the group's stage show, among others. In the autumn, they elected to expand the stage presentation of Tommy further, adding songs like "Overture" and "Sally Simpson" that had been skipped in earlier performances; additionally, show-ending performances of "My Generation" were stretched out to reprise certain parts of the rock opera along with other instrumental passages, such as the chord progression that eventually evolved into "Naked Eye".

While the rock opera remained the focal point of the set into 1970, the band also featured their latest single, "The Seeker" on the 1970 U.S. tour, although it was dropped after two weeks. They also added some material from their in-progress album (eventually abandoned in favour of Townshend's Lifehouse project), performing "Water" and "I Don't Even Know Myself" regularly; "Naked Eye", although unfinished in the studio, was performed in various arrangements on the tour as well, generally during the long show-ending jams during "My Generation".

During the final leg, the set list was the same as on the previous leg, with the exception of "Shakin' All Over" now segueing into the rock standard "Twist and Shout"; the band also stopped including Tommy themes in their long versions of "My Generation" and often moved it into "Naked Eye" and "Magic Bus". They continued to play the same basic set as in August and September, occasionally adding loose versions of Free's "All Right Now" towards the end of the show.

Films and albums 
Over the years, several films and albums have been released of the band's concert performances during the Tommy Tour (all are albums, except where noted).

 The Who at Kilburn: 1977 (DVD disc 2: London, 14 December 1969, released 2008)
 Live at Leeds (album containing entire Leeds, 14 February 1970 show, released 1970)
 Live at Hull (Hull, 15 February 1970, released 2012)
 Live at the Isle of Wight Festival 1970 (album Isle of Wight Festival, 29 August 1970, released 1996)
 Live at the Isle of Wight Festival 1970 (film Isle of Wight Festival, 29 August 1970, released 1996)
 Woodstock – Back to the Garden: The Definitive 50th Anniversary Archive (Woodstock, 17 August 1969, released 2019)

Additionally, songs recorded during the tour have been released along with other live and/or studio material:

 Woodstock (1970): "We're Not Gonna Take It", "See Me, Feel Me",  "My Generation", "Summertime Blues" (Woodstock, 17 August 1969)
 Woodstock: Music from the Original Soundtrack and More (1970): "See Me, Feel Me" (Woodstock, 17 August 1969)
 The Story of The Who (1976): "My Generation", "Summertime Blues" (Leeds, 14 February 1970)
 The Kids Are Alright (soundtrack, 1979): "Sparks", "Pinball Wizard", "See Me, Feel Me" (Woodstock, 17 August 1969), "Young Man Blues" (London, 14 December 1969), "Happy Jack" (Leeds, 14 February 1970)
 The Kids Are Alright (film, 1979): "Sparks", "Pinball Wizard", "See Me, Feel Me" (Woodstock, 17 August 1969), "Young Man Blues" (London, 14 December 1969), 
 Hooligans (1981): "Summertime Blues" (Leeds, 14 February 1970)
 Thirty Years of Maximum R&B (1994): "Sparks", "Abbie Hoffman Incident" (Woodstock, 17 August 1969), "Substitute", "See Me, Feel Me", "Young Man Blues", "Summertime Blues", "Shakin' All Over" (Leeds, 14 February 1970),
 Thirty Years of Maximum R&B Live (1994): "Happy Jack", "I Can't Explain" (London, 14 December 1969), "Heaven and Hell", "I Can't Explain", "Water" (Lenox, 7 July 1970), "Young Man Blues", "I Don't Even Know Myself" (Isle of Wight Festival, 29 August 1970)
 Message to Love (1997): "Young Man Blues", "Naked Eye" (Isle of Wight Festival, 29 August 1970)
 View from a Backstage Pass (2007): "Fortune Teller" (Detroit, 12 October 1969), "Happy Jack", "I'm a Boy", and "A Quick One, While He's Away" (Hull, 15 February 1970) 
 Greatest Hits Live (2010): "Magic Bus" (Leeds, 14 February 1970), "Happy Jack", "I'm a Boy" (Hull, 15 February 1970)

Tour dates

Preview concert in the U.K. and North American leg (1 May – 19 June 1969)

U.K. leg, U.S. contracted appearances, and European tour (5 July – 29 September 1969)

North American leg (10 October – 16 November 1969)

European leg (4 December 1969 – 16 May 1970)

U.S. leg (7 June – 7 July 1970)

European leg (25 July – 20 December 1970)

See also 
 List of The Who tours and performances

Notes

Footnotes

References

External links 
 The Who Past Shows 1969 at the Who's official website
 The Who Past Shows 1970 at the Who's official website

1969 concert tours
1970 concert tours
The Who concert tours
Tommy (rock opera)
Concert tours of Europe
Concert tours of North America